
Gmina Grybów is a rural gmina (administrative district) in Nowy Sącz County, Lesser Poland Voivodeship, in southern Poland. Its seat is the town of Grybów, although the town is not part of the territory of the gmina.

Villages
Gmina Grybów contains the villages and settlements of Biała Niżna, Binczarowa, Chodorowa, Cieniawa, Florynka, Gródek, Kąclowa, Krużlowa Niżna, Krużlowa Wyżna, Polna, Ptaszkowa, Siołkowa, Stara Wieś, Stróże, Wawrzka and Wyskitna.

Neighbouring gminas
Gmina Grybów is bordered by the town of Grybów and by the gminas of Bobowa, Chełmiec, Gorlice, Kamionka Wielka, Korzenna, Krynica-Zdrój, Łabowa, Łużna, Ropa and Uście Gorlickie.

References
Polish official population figures 2006

Grybow
Nowy Sącz County